Fileh Varin (also Romanized as Fīleh Varīn, Fīlahwarīn, Pīlehvarīn, Filakhvarin,  and Fīlehvarīn; also known as Fīleh Vardīn, Filwarin, and Pīleh Vardīn) is a village in Niyarak Rural District, Tarom Sofla District, Qazvin County, Qazvin Province, Iran. At the 2006 census, its population was 157, in 41 families.

References 

Populated places in Qazvin County